The Incredible Hulk: Original Motion Picture Score is the soundtrack for The Incredible Hulk, composed by Craig Armstrong.

Background
Craig Armstrong was the arranger for Massive Attack, a band director Louis Leterrier was fond of and had collaborated with on the 2005 film Unleashed. Armstrong was his first choice, which surprised Marvel, not knowing if he had scored an action film (he did compose 2001's Kiss of the Dragon). Even the temp track consisted of Armstrong's work and similar music by others. The Hulk, alongside the Green Lantern, was one of Armstrong's favorite comics as a child, although he did not see Ang Lee's Hulk. Armstrong began composing in his home in Glasgow, Scotland with three sequences; the Hulk and Betty in the cave; the Abomination and the Hulk's alley fight; and Bruce and Betty's reunion. The majority was composed in a few weeks in Los Angeles, California, which was very intense for the director and composer. The score was recorded over four days during late 2007 in a chapel in Bastyr University, located in Kenmore, Washington. Pete Lockett played ethnic instruments in the score, which were recorded in London and mixed together with the orchestra and electronics. The score was orchestrated by Matt Dunkley, Tony Blondal, Stephen Coleman, David Butterworth, and Kaz Boyle. Leterrier suggested the score be released on two discs, which Armstrong believed to be a joke. Only when he compiled the album – and Marvel asked why they were only given one disc – did he realize they were serious.

The Hulk and the Abomination both have two themes, representing their human and monstrous forms. The Hulk's theme was meant to be iconic and simple, like Jaws (1975), with string glissandos on a bass C note. Banner's theme is tragic and includes parts of Joe Harnell's "The Lonely Man" theme from the television series. Armstrong played the piano for one scene featuring that piece. Blonsky has a dark theme, which becomes aggressive when he transforms. Armstrong inter played the Hulk and the Abomination's themes during their battle, and found scoring the action sequences similar to a dance. There is also a suspenseful theme, and a love theme.

Track listing

Reception

The Chicago Tribune described the soundtrack as "the dullest musical score of the year" in their review of the film, while Dan Goldwasser of Soundtrack.net described it as "bombastic, thematic and energy-filled".

References

2008 soundtrack albums
2000s film soundtrack albums
Craig Armstrong (composer) soundtracks
Marvel Cinematic Universe: Phase One soundtracks
The Incredible Hulk (film)